The Naga people are believed by some to be an ancient tribe who once inhabited Sri Lanka and various parts of Southern India. There are references to Nagas in several ancient texts such as Mahavamsa, Manimekalai, Mahabharata and also in other Sanskrit and Pali literature. They were generally represented as a class of super-humans taking the form of serpents who inhabit a subterranean world.

Certain places such as Nagadeepa in Jaffna and Kalyani in Gampaha are mentioned as their abodes. The names of some Naga kings in Sri Lankan legends such as Mani Akkhitha (Mani Naga) and Mahodara are also found in Sanskrit literature among superhuman Nagas, and the cult of Mani Naga prevailed in India up to medieval times.

The Jaffna Peninsula was mentioned in Tamil literature as Naka Nadu, in Pali literature as Nagadeepa and in Greek gazetteer as Nagadiba. The name Nagabhumi was also found on a Brahmi-inscribed coin from Uduthurai, Jaffna and in a Tamil inscription from Pudukkottai, Tamil Nadu referring to the Jaffna peninsula.

Etymology 
The word "Naga" literally means "snake" or "serpent" in Tamil language, Sanskrit, Pali.

Origin
According to Manogaran, some scholars also "have postulated that the Yakshas and Nagas [...] are the aboriginal tribes of Sri Lanka".  Scholars like K. Indrapala regard them as an ancient tribe who started to assimilate to Tamil culture and language from the 3rd century BCE. According to him, in the end of the 9th century or probably very long before that time, the Nagas assimilated into the two major ethnic groups of the island.

According to V. Kanakasabhai, The Oliyar, Parathavar, Maravar, Paraiyar and  Eyinar who were widespread across South India and North-East Sri Lanka are all Naga tribes. According to several authors they may have been a Dravidian tribe. Many Tamil poets who contributed to the Sangam literature attached Naga prefixes and suffixes to their names to indicate their Naga descent.

Early references

Mahavamsa
The chronicle states that the Buddha, during his second visit to the island, pacified a dispute between two Naga Kings of Nagadeepa, Chulodara and Mahodara over the possession of a gem-studded throne. This throne was finally offered to the Buddha by the grateful Naga kings who left it in Nagadeepa under a Rajayathana tree (Kiri Palu) as an object of worship. Since then the place became one of the holiest shrines of Buddhists in the island for many centuries. The references to Nagadeepa in Mahawamsa as well as other Pali writings, coupled with archaeological and epigraphical evidences, have established that Nagadeepa of the Mahawamsa is the present Jaffna Peninsula.

The chronicle further states that in the eighth year after the Enlightenment, the Buddha visited the island for the third time, on an invitation of Maniakkhita, the Naga king of Kalyani (Modern day Kelaniya) who is the uncle of the Naga king of Nagadeepa.

Manimekalai
In the Tamil epic Manimekalai, the heroine is miraculously transported to a small island called Manipallavam where there was a seat or foot stool associated to the Buddha. The seat in Manipallavam is said to have been used by the Buddha when he preached and reconciled the two kings of Naga land, and that it was placed in Manipallavam by the king of gods, Indra. The legend speaks of the great Naga king Valai Vanan and his queen Vasamayilai who ruled over Manipallavam in the Jaffna Peninsula. Their daughter, the princess Pilli Valai had a liaison at the islet with the early Chola king Killivalavan; out of this union was the prince Tondai Eelam Thiraiyar born, who historians note was the early progenitor of the Pallava Dynasty. He went on to rule Tondai Nadu from Kanchipuram. Nainativu was referred to as Manipallavam in ancient Tamil literature following this union. Royals of the Chola-Naga lineage would go on to rule other territory of the island, Nagapattinam and Tondai Nadu of Tamilakam.

By the time Buddhism had reached Tamilakam, the twin epics of ancient Tamil Nadu Silappatikaram (5–6th century CE) and Manimekalai (6th century CE) were written, speaking of Naga Nadu across the sea from Kaveripoompuharpattinam. The island according to the Tamil epic was divided into two territory, Naga Nadu and Ilankaitheevam. Naga Nadu, or the whole island was also known as Cherantheevu, derived from Dravidian words Cheran (meaning Naga) and theevu (meaning island).

Identifying Manipallavam
The similarity of the legend about the Buddha's seat given in the Mahavamsa to that in the Manimekalai has led certain scholars to identify the Manipallavam with Nagadeepa (currently Nainativu), which has caused the history to be extracted out of the legend.

Cīttalai Cāttanār, the author of the Manimekalai, reflected the perception at the time that Naga Nadu was an autonomous administrative entity, kingdom or nadu stretching across coastal districts, distinguished from the rest of the island also ruled intermittently by Naga kings.

The Naga king Valai Vanan was stated in the Manimekalai to be the king of Naga Nadu, one of the two territories in Sri Lanka, the other being Ilankaitheevam. Several scholars identify Naga Nadu with the Jaffna Peninsula, and Manipallavam with Nainativu. Other scholars identify Karaitivu as Manipallavam.

Senarath Paranavithana rejects the identification of Manipallavam with Nainativu and the Jaffna Peninsula, because Manimekalai states the island to have been uninhabited, whereas the Jaffna Peninsula have been inhabited centuries before the date of the epic. He also notes that Manimekalai does not mention that the two Naga kings had their abode in Manipallavam as stated in the Mahavamsa, nor did it mention that the holy seat was placed there by Gautama Buddha, but by Indra. Further states Canto IX, II. 13–22 that an earthquake destroyed a city in Gandhara which in turn affteced 100 yojanas of Naga Nadu, thus rejecting the identification of Naga Nadu with Jaffna Peninsula.

Ramayana

In the Indian epic Ramayana, the mythological island Lanka has been often identified with Sri Lanka. The inhabitants of Lanka were mentioned as non-humans, mainly referring to the Rakshasas and Yakshas, but also mentioning the Nagas. Indrajit, the son of Ravana was married to Sulochana, a Naga princess.

Others
Ptolemy in his 1st century map of Taprobane mentions Nagadibois. Ptolemy mentions in 150 CE that King Sornagos, a descendant of this lineage, ruled from the early Chola capital of Uraiyur during this time.

Culture

Irrigation
It is also believed they were great irrigation engineers who built water storages. The Giant's Tank dam and reservoir system in Mannar, Sri Lanka is considered by some (Such as Author, Mudaliyar C. Rajanayagam) to have been built by the Nagas based on the extensive ruins and the presence of villages with surrounding the port with Naga name (e.g. Nagarkulam, Nagathazhvu and Sirunagarkulam).

Snake worship
Sri Lankan Tamil Hindus since ancient times have regarded the cobra as a divine being by the passing down of Naga traditions and beliefs. Further, a cobra can be found entwining itself round the neck of the Hindu god Shiva as the serpent-king Vasuki. Cobras can also be found in images of god Vishnu.

Religion 
There is substantial evidence to say that Nagas were Buddhist followers after the 4th century B.C . One such example is Buddha's second visit Sri Lanka mentioned in both the Manimekalai and Mahavamsa.

See also
 Ancient clans of Lanka

Notes

References

Bibliography

 

Nāgas
Non-human races in Hindu mythology
Exotic tribes in Hindu scripture
Indigenous peoples of South Asia
Ethnic groups in India
Sri Lankan mythology